Ruslan Kokshin (born May 7, 1979) is an officer in the Russian military. While serving as a leader of a mortar platoon, Kokshin located and took out a small group of opposition forces in Chechnya. Due to this action by him, Kokshin was awarded the title Hero of the Russian Federation for his "heroic duty while in the service of the state."

References

Kokshin, Ruslan
Kokshin, Ruslan
Living people
1979 births
People from Tula, Russia